Africa, Center of the World is a studio album by American musician Roy Ayers. It was released in 1981 through Polydor Records. Recording sessions for the album took place at Artisian Sound Recording Studio in Hollywood, California and Sigma Sound Studios in New York City. The album is dedicated to Fela Kuti and Bob Marley.

Track listing

Personnel
Roy Ayers - lead vocals, vibraphone, electric piano, Clavinet, marimba, bass marimba, handclaps
Carla Vaughn, Marva Hicks, Sylvia Striplin, Terri Wells - lead vocals
James "Jaymz" Bedford - lead and backing vocals, Clavinet, ARP synthesizer, cowbell, handclaps
Jeffery Quiton - guitar
Chuck Anthony - guitar, handclaps
Peter Brown - bass
Harold Land, Jr., Lesette Wilson - electric piano
Omar Hakim, Quentin Dennard, Steve Cobb - drums
Dom Um Romão - percussion
Weldon Arthur McDougal III - quica drums
William Allen - bass marimba, bells, shekere, handclaps
Dennis "Gorilla" Armstead - glass harmonica
Debbe Cole, Ethel Beatty, Sylvia Striplin - backing vocals
Jojo Lole Dawodu, Omo Yeni Anikulapo-Kuti - speaking voices
Erlean Perry - voice narration on "Africa, Center of the World"
William Allen - "father" voice on "Intro/The River Niger"
Miles Bailer Armstead - "little boy" voice on "Intro/The River Niger"

Charts

References

External links 

1981 albums
Roy Ayers albums
Polydor Records albums
Albums produced by Roy Ayers
Albums recorded at Sigma Sound Studios